Ángel Fuentes Paniego (born 5 November 1996) is a Spanish cyclist, who currently rides for UCI ProTeam .

Major results
2019
 1st Prologue & Stage 1 Vuelta Ciclista a León
 1st Aiztondo Klasika
2021
 6th Route Adélie
2022
 10th Route Adélie

References

External links

1996 births
Living people
Spanish male cyclists
Sportspeople from Burgos
Cyclists from Castile and León